E-Rotic Megamix may refer to:

 Dancemania Presents E-Rotic Megamix, a remix album by German eurodance project E-Rotic
 a track from their album The Power of Sex
 "Die geilste Single der Welt", which is a megamix by E-Rotic